Crepidozaena gracilis is a species of beetle in the family Carabidae, the only species in the genus Crepidozaena.

References

Paussinae